The 1973–74 WCHL season was the eighth season for the Western Canada Hockey League. Twelve teams completed a 68-game season.  The Regina Pats won the President's Cup before going on to win the Memorial Cup.

League notes
The Vancouver Nats relocated to Kamloops, British Columbia to become the Kamloops Chiefs
The Winnipeg Jets became the Winnipeg Clubs.

Regular season

Final standings

Scoring leaders
Note: GP = Games played; G = Goals; A = Assists; Pts = Points; PIM = Penalties in minutes

1974 WCHL Playoffs

League quarter-finals
Swift Current defeated Flin Flon 4 games to 3
Regina defeated Saskatoon 4 games to 2
New Westminster defeated Medicine Hat 4 games to 2
Calgary defeated Edmonton 4 games to 1

League semi-finals
Regina defeated Swift Current 4 games to 2
Calgary defeated New Westminster 4 games to 1

WHL Championship
Regina defeated Calgary 4 games to 0

All-Star game

On January 29, the West All-Stars defeated the East All-Stars 6–5 at Edmonton, Alberta with a crowd of 2,471.

WHL awards

All-Star Team
Goaltender: Larry Hendrick, Edmonton Oil Kings
Defenseman: Pat Price, Saskatoon Blades
Defenseman: Ron Greschner, New Westminster Bruins & Greg Joly, Regina Pats (tied)
Centerman: Ron Chipperfield, Brandon Wheat Kings & Dennis Sobchuk, Regina Pats (tied)
Left Winger: Clark Gillies, Regina Pats
Right Winger: Danny Gare, Calgary Centennials

See also
1974 Memorial Cup
1974 NHL Entry Draft
1973 in sports
1974 in sports

References
whl.ca
 2005–06 WHL Guide

Western Hockey League seasons
WCHL